Lophiocarpus is a genus of flowering plants belonging to the family Lophiocarpaceae.

Its native range is Southern Tropical and Southern Africa.

Species:

Lophiocarpus dinteri 
Lophiocarpus latifolius 
Lophiocarpus polystachyus 
Lophiocarpus tenuissimus

References

Caryophyllales
Caryophyllales genera